Lurë is a former municipality in the Dibër County, northeastern Albania. At the 2015 local government reform it became a subdivision of the municipality Dibër. The population at the 2011 census was 1,096. The region of Lurë is inhabited by the Albanian Lura tribe.

Old Lurë, Lurë Plain and Borie Lurë, are the three neighborhoods of Lurë. More villages are in the municipality of Lurë such as Krej Lurë, Pregj Lurë, Arrmall, Vlashe and Gur Lure. With an area of 1,280 hectares, the Lurë National Park is situated in the eastern side of the mountain massive of "Kunora e Lures". Its 14 icy lakes offer picturesque and attractive environments at an altitude of 1.350-1.720 m. Among the many lakes the one that stand out are the Big Lake (32 hectares), the Lake of Pines (13 hectares), the Black Lake (8 hectares) and the Lake of Flowers (4 hectares), and The Grand Lake (Albanian: Liqeni i Madh). In winter these lakes freeze.

History 
Lura is an old village in the Dibër county and has a fascinating history. After Skanderbegs death in 1468 the Ottomans wanted 300 women from Lura. The people of Lura were angered so instead of sending woman in Duvaks they sent 300 men in Duvaks with weapons to fight the ottomans. The men were sent on horseback to the ottoman camp and then when they got there the ottomans were waiting and then they started fighting the ottomans and they eventually won the battle.

Demographic history
Lurë appears in the Ottoman defter of 1467 as a village in the timar of Ali Vardari in the vilayet of Lower Dibra. The settlement had a total of nine households represented by the following household heads: Pop Sima; Mirko, brother of Pop Sima; Gjergj Limaçi; Martini, son of Gjergji; Shtjefan Matarisi; Gjon Gjerboçi; Peter Smaqi (Zmaqi); and Tolë Miçoqi.

Notable people
Nikollë Kaçorri

References

Former municipalities in Dibër County
Administrative units of Dibër (municipality)